Hardware: Rivals was an online multiplayer vehicular combat game developed by SCE Connected Content Group and published by Sony Computer Entertainment for the PlayStation 4. It was the successor to the 2002 PlayStation 2 game, Hardware: Online Arena.

Gameplay 
The game gave players the option to play in either Tanks or Fast Attack Vehicles (FAVs), collecting various special weapon pickups such as Lasers, Railguns and Rockets.

During the Public Beta, there were three maps available to play on: "Blister Lake", "Quarry" (later known as "Jackson's Pit") and "Lost Temple". There were also two vehicles: the "Wraith" FAV and the "Predator" Tank.

In addition to deathmatch, team deathmatch and team domination multiplayer modes, the game also featured three single-player training modes, including "Time Trial" and "Target Practice".

Development 
The game was first announced on 10 September 2015 and is developed by the SCE Connected Content Group, based in London.

A Public Beta for the game took place from 30 September 2015 to 19 October 2015, and was exclusive to PlayStation Plus subscribers. When the PS Events app was released as part of the PlayStation 4 system software 3.00, the Hardware: Rivals beta was one of the first titles to make in-game events available such as "4 Wheels Only", an FAV-only special event. The game was released on 5 January 2016. The release of the game also introduced the "Nomad" FAV and the "Sledgehammer" Tank, the Team Elimination game mode, and a new map, "Outpost 92", to the game.

The first major update for the game was released on 22 January 2016, which added the "Scarab" FAV and the "Barbarian" Tank to the game. The next major game update, released on 26 February 2016, added a new map, "Mojito Bay", and introduced "Ranked Play", where players had the ability to compete against each other and earn exclusive vehicle skins and add-ons by ranking up. Update 1.13, released on 13 May 2016, added a new map, "Bushpig Plateau", and introduced a new team game mode called "Capture the Flag". Update 1.16, released on 19 August 2016, added a new map, "Eagle Ridge".

Reception 
The game was met with mixed reception upon its release. It has a score of 56% on Metacritic. IGN awarded it a score of 5.5 out of 10, saying "There is fun to be had, but the novelty of Hardware: Rivals wears thin pretty quickly."

Shutdown 
Around 26 August 2021, it was announced that the game's servers would be shut down on 8 December 2021. In addition, the game had been quietly delisted from the Playstation Store. This announcement was not shared by PlayStation's social media team, but rather via an in-game message.

References 

2016 video games
Delisted digital-only games
Inactive online games
Multiplayer and single-player video games
PlayStation Network games
PlayStation 4-only games
PlayStation 4 games
Products and services discontinued in 2021
Sony Interactive Entertainment games
Unreal Engine games
Vehicular combat games
Video game remakes
Video games developed in the United Kingdom